Jilotepec (Nahuatl: "on the hill of jilotes") is a municipality in the Mexican state of Veracruz, located  north-northwest of the state capital Xalapa.

Geography
It borders the municipalities of Coacoatzintla to the north, Naolinco to the northeast, Xalapa to the southeast, Banderilla to the south, Rafael Lucio to the southwest, and Tlacolulan to the northwest.

The municipality is drained by upper tributaries of the Actopan River. The perennial Naolinco River forms part of Jilotepec's border with the municipality of Naolinco. 

Jilotepec's climate is generally humid with rain throughout the year.

History
Jilotepec was founded by the Totonac people in 980 as part of the confederation of Tlacolulan. The Teochichimecas controlled Jilotepec from 1380 to 1489, when Jilotepec switched its allegiance to the Aztec Empire. A hacienda was established at La Concepción at the end of the 16th century. The parish of Jilotepec was inaugurated in 1811.

On 28 March 1831, Jilotepec became a municipality in the canton of Xalapa in the state of Veracruz. It became a free municipality on 15 January 1918. From 1995 to the beginning of the 21st century a wave of emigration occurred from central Veracruz to the United States; inhabitants from Jilotepec in particular preferred to emigrate to New York City.

Administration
The municipal government comprises a president, a councillor (Spanish: síndico), and a trustee (regidor). The current president of the municipality is Sergio Fernández Lara.

Demographics
In the 2010 Mexican Census, the municipality of Jilotepec recorded a population of 15,313 inhabitants living in 3734 households. The 2015 Intercensal Survey estimated a population of 16,682 inhabitants in Jilotepec, of which 3.97% reported being of African descent. 

There are 31 localities in the municipality, of which two are classified as urban:
 The municipal seat, also called Jilotepec, which recorded a population of 3871 inhabitants in the 2010 Census; and

Economy
The main economic activity in Jilotepec is agriculture, involving mainly the cultivation of coffee, sugarcane, corn and beans. Cattle and pigs are also raised.

References

Municipalities of Veracruz
1831 establishments in Mexico
States and territories established in 1831